Platyedra subcinerea, the mallow groundling or cotton stem moth, is a moth of the family Gelechiidae. It is found in most of Europe. It is an in introduced species in North America, where it has been recorded from New England and California, and has also been introduced to New Zealand. The habitat consists of wet meadows, marshes and gardens.

The wingspan is 14–21 mm. The forewings are tan, speckled and with a longitudinal series of alternating dots and streaks through the middle of the wing. The dots are usually surrounded by a lighter patch and the last dot may be double. The tips of the forewings are darker. The hindwings are very pale grey.

The larvae feed on Parietaria officinalis, Urtica species, Althaea officinalis, Lavatera thuringiaca and Malva sylvestris.

References

Moths described in 1860
Pexicopiini
Moths of Europe